Reveille: The Great Awakening is a 1925 German silent war film directed by Fritz Kaufmann and starring Werner Krauss, Ruth Weyher and Gerd Briese. It is sometimes confused with the 1924 British film Reveille by George Pearson, but the two films apparently have no links other than their similar title.

The film's sets were designed by Karl Machus.

Cast
 Werner Krauss
 Ruth Weyher
 Gerd Briese
 Albert Steinrück
 Victor Colani
 Fritz Kampers
 Lilly Flohr
 Maria West
 Ernst Pittschau

References

Bibliography
 Bock, Hans-Michael & Bergfelder, Tim. The Concise CineGraph. Encyclopedia of German Cinema. Berghahn Books, 2009.

External links
 

1925 films
1925 war films
German war films
Films of the Weimar Republic
German silent feature films
Films directed by Fritz Kaufmann
German World War I films
German black-and-white films
Silent war films
1920s German films
1920s German-language films